Brian Schrapel (born 17 May 1946) is an Australian equestrian. He competed in two events at the 1972 Summer Olympics.

References

1946 births
Living people
Australian male equestrians
Olympic equestrians of Australia
Equestrians at the 1972 Summer Olympics
Place of birth missing (living people)